Camp is an English surname taken from Latin roots.  The name is found in Great Britain and in other places throughout the world settled by the English.  According to the 2000 census there are fewer than 1300 Camps in the UK. The 2000 US census puts the number at over 27,000, making it the 1087th most common name in America, after McDermott.  The Australian government currently reports 465 persons named Camp.  The governments of Canada, New Zealand, and South Africa do not currently provide lists of surnames as the UK and others do.  Totals outside the English-speaking world are also unknown.

Origins

People with the surname Camp have no single origin or ancestor, the name instead having been chosen by different families over a few centuries.  The name is sometimes a variant spelling of "Kemp", which comes from the Old West Germanic "kampo-z", meaning "a contest, or fight", which in turn became the Old English "kemp", for a "fighter" or "soldier."  However, the name usually denotes a family whose house was on an open field, or "camp", rather than in the woods or elsewhere.  The word was borrowed from the Middle French "camp", its first use in English, in 1528, being for a "place where an army lodges temporarily", only later transferring to a non-military use sometime after 1560.  The French "camp" (later "champ") is itself derived from the Latin "campus", which also meant an "open field", but also and especially an "open space for military exercise".  Coincidentally, the word's martial sense had been borrowed by the Germanic tribes during their conflicts with the Romans to become the aforementioned "kampo-z".

 
Throughout the English-speaking world, but especially the United States, the name is sometimes derived from other, often longer, European names (e.g. the Italian "Campesi" or the Dutch "Van de Kamp") which were changed during the process of cultural assimilation.  Camp can also be a shortening or anglicizing of similar French names, such as "de Camp" and "du Camp".

Notable people with the Camp surname
Adrienne Camp (born 1981), South African singer-songwriter
Albert Sidney Camp (1892–1954), American politician, educator and lawyer
Anna Camp (1982– ), American actress
Bill Camp (1961-), American actor
Billy Joe Camp, American politician
Blake Camp (1983– ), American soccer (football) player
Bob Camp (1954– ), American cartoonist and writer
Candace Camp (1949– ), American novelist
Charles Lewis Camp (1893–1975), American paleontologist and zoologist
Colleen Camp (1953– ), American actress
Dalton Camp (1920–2002), Canadian politician and commentator
Dave Camp (1953– ), American politician
David M. Camp (1788–1871), American attorney and politician
Donald Camp (1940– ), American artist, photographer, and professor
Eldad Cicero Camp (1839–1920), American coal tycoon, attorney and philanthropist
Frank Camp (1905–1986), American football coach
Garrett Camp, American businessman 
Greg Camp (1967– ), American songwriter, guitarist and vocalist
Hamilton Camp (1934–2005), English-American singer, songwriter, and actor
Harold V. Camp (1935-2022), American lawyer, politician, and businessman
Helen Page Camp (1930–1991), American actress
Howie Camp (1893–1960), American baseball player
Jack Tarpley Camp Jr. (1943– ), American former judge
Jalen Camp (born 1998), American football player
Jeremy Camp (1978– ), American Christian musician
Jesse Camp (1979– ), American music television presenter
Joe Camp (1939– ), American film director
John Lafayette Camp (1828–1891), American politician
John Lafayette Camp Jr. (1855–1918), American politician
John H. Camp (1840–1892), American politician
John Newbold Camp (1908–1987), American politician
Kid Camp (1869–1895), American baseball pitcher
L. Jean Camp, American professor
Laurie Smith Camp (1953-2020), American judge
Lee Camp (comedian) (1981– ), American comedian
Lee Camp (footballer) (1984– ), English football (soccer) player
Lew Camp (1868–1948), American baseball player
Melanie Camp, Australian actress
Rick Camp (1953–2013), American baseball pitcher
Roger Camp (1946– ) American photographer and educator
Shawn Camp (baseball) (1975– ), American baseball pitcher
Shawn Camp (musician) (1966 ), American Country musician
Steve Camp (1955– ), American Christian musician
Walter Camp (1859–1925), American football coach and sports writer
Walter Mason Camp (1867–1925), American author, railroad expert, and historian
William B. Camp (1913–1975), American bureaucrat
Wofford Benjamin Camp (1894–1986), American agronomist

See also
 English diaspora
 United States census
 Census in the United Kingdom
 Census in Australia
 Census in Canada
 South African National Census of 2001

References